Syrian Drama TV is a government owned television station based in Damascus, Syria since 20 August 2009. Syrian Drama TV broadcast was stopped on Eutelsat  Hot Bird 13 East on 22 October 2012. Its goal was to support Syrian drama after the great successes it achieved in the Arab world and to shed light on issues of Syrian society in particular and the Arab community in general. It is focused on social, cultural, economic, political and life issues for the Syrian and Arab citizens.

See also
 List of Syrian television series
 List of Syrian films

References

External links
Syrian Drama TV live stream 

2009 establishments in Syria
Arabic-language television stations
Television channels in Syria
Television channels and stations established in 2009
Mass media in Damascus